Stenger is a surname. Notable people with the surname include:

Georg Stenger, German philosopher
Harvey G. Stenger, American educator and academic administrator
Michael C. Stenger, 41st Sergeant at Arms of the United States Senate (?-2022)
Nicole Stenger, French artist
Steve Stenger, American attorney
Victor J. Stenger (1935–2014), American particle physicist
William Stenger (1840–1918), American politician

See also
Stengers

German-language surnames
Occupational surnames